The polynomials calculating sums of powers of arithmetic progressions are polynomials in a variable that depend both on the particular arithmetic progression constituting the basis of the summed powers and on the constant exponent, non-negative integer, chosen. Their degree always exceeds the constant exponent by one unit and have the property that when the polynomial variable coincides with the number of summed addends, the result of the polynomial function also coincides with that of the sum.

The problem therefore consists in finding i.e. polynomials as a function of  calculating sums of  addends:

The two parameters can be not only integers but also rational, real and even complex.

History

Ancient period 
The history of the problem begins in antiquity and coincides with that of some of its special cases. The case  coincides with that of the calculation of the arithmetic series, the sum of the first  values of an arithmetic progression. This problem is quite simple but the case already known by the Pythagorean school for its connection with triangular numbers is historically interesting:
  Polynomial  calculating the sum of the first  natural numbers.
For  the first cases encountered in the history of mathematics are:
  Polynomial  calculating the sum of the first  successive odds forming a square. A property probably well known by the Pythagoreans themselves who, in constructing their figured numbers, had to add each time a gnomon consisting of an odd number of points to obtain the next perfect square.
  Polynomial  calculating the sum of the squares of the successive integers. Property that we find demonstrated in Spirals, a work of Archimedes;
  Polynomial  calculating the sum of the cubes of the successive integers. Corollary of a theorem of  Nicomachus of Gerasa...
L'insieme  of the cases, to which the two preceding polynomials belong, constitutes the classical problem of powers of successive integers.

Middle period 
Over time, many other mathematicians became interested in the problem and made various contributions to its solution. These include Aryabhata, Al-Karaji, Ibn al-Haytham, Thomas Harriot, Johann Faulhaber, Pierre de Fermat and Blaise Pascal who recursively solved the problem of the sum of powers of successive integers by considering an identity that allowed to obtain a polynomial of degree  already knowing the previous ones.

In 1713 the family of Jacob Bernoulli posthumously publishes his '' Artis Conjectandi  where the first 10 polynomials of this infinite series appear together with a general formula dependent on particular numbers that were soon named after him. The formula was instead attributed to Johann Faulhaber for his worthy contributions recognized by Bernoulli himself.
It was also immediately clear that the polynomials  calcolating the sum of   powers of successive integers starting from zero were very similar to those starting from one. This is because it is evident that and that therefore polynomials of degree  of the form   subtracted the monomial difference  they become .

However, a proof of Faulhaber's formula was missing, which was given more than a century later by Carl G. Jacobi who benefited from the progress of mathematical analysis using the development in infinite series of an exponential function generating Bernoulli numbers.

Modern period 
In 1982 A.W.F. Edwards publishes an article  in which he shows that Pascal's identity can be expressed by means of triangular matrices containing the Pascal's triangle deprived of 'last element of each line:

The example is limited by the choice of a fifth order matrix but is easily extendable to higher orders. Other authors after Edwards dealing with various aspects of the power sum problem take the matrix path  and studying aspects of the problem in their articles useful tools such as the Vandermonde vector. Other researchers continue to explore through the traditional analytic route  and generalize the problem of the sum of successive integers to any geometric progression

The coefficients of the polynomials  are found through recursive formulas and in other ways that are interesting for number theory as the expression of the result of the sum as a function of Bernoulli polynomials or the formulas involving the Stirling numbers and the r-Whitney numbers of the first and second kind 
Finally, Edwards' matrix approach was also generalized to any arithmetic progressions

Solution by matrix method 
The general problem has recently been solved  through the use of binomial matrices easily constructible knowing the binomial coefficients and the Pascal's triangle.

with the polynomial coefficients elements of the row  of the triangular matrix  of order .

Here is the solving formula in the particular case  which gives the polynomials of a given arithmetic progression with exponents from 0 to 3:

The equation that can be easily extended to different values of m (non-negative integers) is summarized and generalized as follows:

 or also by placing with 

 

Here is the rigorous definition of the matrices and the Vandermonde vector:

for  it results therefore

Matrix A is that of Edwards  already seen, a lower triangular matrix that reproduces, in the non-null elements, the triangle of Pascal deprived of the last element of each row.

 is the neutral element of the row by column product so that the general equation in this case becomes:

 that is the one discovered by Edwards 

To arrive from this particular case to prove the general one, it is sufficient to multiply on the left the two members of the equation by the matrix  after having ascertained the following identity

Sum of powers of successive odd numbers 
We use the previous formula to solve the problem of adding powers of successive odds:. The odds correspond to the arithmetic progression with the first element  and as reason  We set m = 4 to find the first five polynomials calculating sums of powers of odd. Calculated  we obtain:

We have therefore

using the last line we get then

and using the other rows:

Sum of successive integers starting with 1 
Chosen  and calculated  and T(1,1)  which corresponds to Pascal's triangle:

Sum of successive integers starting with 0 
Chosen  and calculated  and T(0,1) unit matrix:

Progression -1,3,7,11,15 ... 
Chosen again , calculated , exploited the result of the previous paragraph and the associative property:

Generalization of Faulhaber's formula 
The matrix  can be expressed as a function of the Bernoulli polynomials in the following way

which for  becomes 
from which the generalized Faulhaber formula is derived:

and also the well-known special cases:

where the Bernoulli polynomials calculated in 0 are the Bernoulli numbers and those calculated in 1 are its variant with  changed of sign.

Being  for the property of translation of Bernoulli's polynomials, the generalized Faulhaber formula can become:

very widespread, unlike the other, in the literature.
Hence also the two special cases:

References

See also 
 Arithmetic progressions
 Faulhaber's formula
 Pascal's triangle
 Bernoulli polynomials

Polynomials